Charummood is a town in Mavelikkara Taluk of Alappuzha district in Kerala. Charummood is 12 km east of the nearest town Kayamkulam, 15 km west of Adoor and 12 km south of Mavelikkara. Charummood Junction is at the intersection of KP Road (Kayamkulam- Punalur Road) and NH 183 (Kollam - Theni Highway). 
The Vetticode Nagaraja Temple is located 4 kilometres from Charummood. Chunakkara mahadevar temple, also located 4 Km from Charummoodn, is famous for sarvam swayambhoo deity and its festival is the first main festival of the Onattukara area.  Padanilam Parabrahma Temple, which is famous for its Sivarathri festival, is about 5 kilometers from Charummood.

Education
Major educational institutions in Charummood are Vikjana Vilasini Higher Secondary School Thamarakkulam(VVHSS Thamarakkulam), St. Marys L.P.S. Charummood,  St. Joseph's Convent School, Presidency College of Management and Technology, which is MG & Kerala University off-campus Centre, Presidency Public School, ISET Polytechnic College.

Places of worship
Christian: St Joseph's Convent and St Mary's Syro-Malankara Catholic Church are located near the centre of town.
Hindu: Main temples near Charummood are Vetticode Nagaraja Swamy temple, Chunakkara mahadevar temple, Padanilam parabrahma temple etc.
Muslim: The main Mosque is Chunakara South Muslim-Jamath and Nouril huda Islam madrasa.

Healthcare
Nearby hospitals are SN Hospital and St. Thomas Mission Hospital

References

Cities and towns in Alappuzha district